MF  Hrvat is a ferry owned by Croatian shipping company Jadrolinija with the capacity of 1200 passengers and 138 cars. The ship was built in Kraljevica Shipyard in Croatia and named after an old Croatian steamer from the 1900s. Hrvat operates on the route Split–Supetar. The passenger spaces of the ship are air-conditioned. The equipment includes hydraulic ramps and escalators.

References

Passenger ships
Ferries of Croatia
2007 ships